Syntherata janetta is a moth of the family Saturniidae, commonly known as the emperor moth.

Description
The wings have zigzag markings, sometimes with dark splotches, and a small circular spot on each wing.
The larvae are large greenish spiny caterpillars that feed on various plants, including Euodia elleryana, Geijera salicifolia, Glochidion ferdinandi, Petalostigma quadriloculare, Aegiceras, Ceriops, Timonius rumphii and Podocarpus spinulosus.

Habitat and range
Syntherata janetta are found in heavily forested areas including rainforest in New Guinea and in coastal eastern Australia as far south as Newcastle.

References

External links
 Australian Insects
 Australian Faunal Directory

Saturniinae
Moths described in 1843